Saša Ivanović is a Montenegrin football goalkeeper who plays for OFK Titograd.

Club career
He had a spell in Poland, playing for ŁKS Łódź in the 2008/09 Polish Cup.

References

External links
 

1984 births
Living people
Association football goalkeepers
Serbia and Montenegro footballers
Montenegrin footballers
FK Zeta players
ŁKS Łódź players
FK Dečić players
FK Mornar players
OFK Titograd players
Second League of Serbia and Montenegro players
First League of Serbia and Montenegro players
Montenegrin First League players
Montenegrin expatriate footballers
Expatriate footballers in Poland
Montenegrin expatriate sportspeople in Poland